Mudéjar may refer to:

 Multiple Mudéjar revolts in the Kingdom of Valencia between 1240 and 1280
 Mudéjar revolt of 1264–1266, in parts of Castile
 Rebellion of the Alpujarras (1499–1501), by the Mudéjars in the Kingdom of Granada